{{Infobox cultivar
| name = Ulmus davidiana var. japonica 'Freedom'
| variety = Ulmus davidiana var. japonica
| cultivar = 'Freedom'
| origin = Canada
}}
The Japanese Elm cultivar Ulmus davidiana var. japonica 'Freedom' is another cold-resistant selection from Canada, raised along with 'Discovery' in the 1980s by Dr Wilbert Ronald, of Jeffries Nurseries Ltd., and Rick Durrand of Shade Consulting Services, Portage la Prairie, Manitoba .

Description
Little descriptive information is available, beyond its comparison with the 'Discovery' clone in the latter's patent application, in which it is noted that 'Freedom' has an open crown with codominant lateral branching, and leaves tinged reddish-purple in autumn. 
The species does not sucker from roots. 

Pests and diseases
The tree has a similar resistance to Dutch elm disease and elm leaf beetle Xanthogaleruca luteola'' as 'Discovery'.

Cultivation
'Freedom' is not known to be in cultivation beyond Canada.

Accessions
None known.

Nurseries

North America

Patmore Nursery , Brandon, Manitoba, Canada.
Sun Valley Garden Centre , Eden Prairie, Minnesota, US.

References

Japanese elm cultivar
Ulmus articles missing images
Ulmus